Stavilac (literally meaning "placer") was a court title in Medieval Bosnia and Medieval Serbia in the Middle Ages. It was similar to the Byzantine court offices of domestikos and cup-bearer (pinkernes, known in Serbian as peharnik). It had a role in the ceremony at the royal table, though the holder could be entrusted with jobs that had nothing to do with court ritual. According to studies of Rade Mihaljčić, the holder was in charge of acquiring, preparing and serving food at the royal table. It was a confidant duty, given to the highest and most notable nobility, in which the ruler relied on in all occasions.

History of usage
Its oldest mention is from the Serbian court of King Stefan Milutin (r. 1282–1321), when Đuraš Vrančić had the title. The title of stavilac ranked as the last in the hierarchy of the Serbian court, behind čelnik, kaznac, tepčija and vojvoda, the supreme title. It was, nevertheless, quite prestigious as it enabled its holder to be very close to the ruler. In the Dečani chrysobulls, King Stefan Dečanski (r. 1321–1331) mentioned that the court dignitaries present at the Dečani assembly were the kaznac, tepčija, vojvoda, sluga and stavilac. There is not much information on the title-holders at the court of King Stefan Dečanski; there is however much information on those at the court of King and Emperor Stefan Dušan (r. 1331–1355).

In Bosnia, this court title appears for the first time with a coronation of the first Bosnian king, Tvrtko I Kotromanić. As soon as he ascended to a Bosnian throne as a king in 1377, Tvrtko reorganized his court reflecting some of the Serbian court-office titles, ceremonials and traditions.

List of Bosnian stavilac
Tvrtko Vlađević (1378), served King Tvrtko I
Ivan Radivojević (1392) served King Dabiša

List of Serbian stavilac
 
Đuraš Vrančić (?), served King Stefan Milutin.
Miloš Vojinović ( 1333), served King Stefan Dušan. Son of Vojvoda Vojin.
Gradislav Sušenica, served King Stefan Dušan. (disputed)
Vojislav Vojinović ( 1350–55), served Emperor Stefan Dušan. Son of Vojvoda Vojin.
Lazar Hrebeljanović ( 1355–1362), served Emperor Stefan Dušan and Emperor Uroš V.

See also
Serbian noble titles
Stolnik, title in Poland and Muscovy

References

Sources

 
 

Bosnian noble titles
Kingdom of Bosnia
Serbian noble titles
Kingdom of Serbia (medieval)
Serbian Empire
Court titles in the Middle Ages
Serbo-Croatian words and phrases
Obsolete occupations
Ceremonial occupations